Stephan van der Heyden (born 3 July 1969) is a Belgian professional football coach and former player, who last worked as the assistant manager of Indian Super League club Kerala Blasters FC.

Playing career
A midfielder during his playing career, Stephan Van Der Heyden has played for various clubs including Waasland-Beveren, Club Brugge, Beerschot AC and Royal Cappellen FC in Belgium, Roda JC in Netherlands, South Melbourne FC in Australia and LOSC Lille in France. He has also made a handful of appearances for the Belgian national teams in the junior and senior levels. He was in the Belgium squad for the 1994 FIFA World Cup.

Managerial career
After retiring from professional football in 2003, he returned to the game as a coach in 2010. He started his coaching career at Sporting Lokeren before returning to former club Brugge. At Brugge, Hyden began as part of their scouting team. In June 2013, he was appointed as the club’s assistant coach and continued with them for the next four years. In 2017, he signed with Macedonian club FK Vardar Skopje to take on the role of assistant coach once again. The following year, he started working with Jordan national team head coach Vital Borkelmans as his assistant.

On 14 October 2021, it was announced that Lokeren has been appointed as the assistant coach of the Indian Super League club Kerala Blasters ahead of the 2021–22 season.

Honours
Roda JC
KNVB Cup: 1996–97

References

External links

soccer camps by Stephan Van Der Heyden
Kerala Blasters FC announced the appointment of Stephan van der Heyden as their new assistant coach

1969 births
Living people
Belgian footballers
Footballers from East Flanders
Association football midfielders
K.S.K. Beveren players
Club Brugge KV players
Belgium international footballers
Beerschot A.C. players
Lille OSC players
Roda JC Kerkrade players
Belgian Pro League players
Eredivisie players
1994 FIFA World Cup players
Royal Cappellen F.C. players
People from Sint-Gillis-Waas
Kerala Blasters FC non-playing staff
Club Brugge KV non-playing staff